Honorary citizen of Zrenjanin is a title awarded by the leadership of the Serbian city of Zrenjanin on behalf of the city.

List of honorary citizens
The list includes people who have been awarded the title of honorary citizen of Zrenjanin.

See also
List of honorary citizens of Belgrade
List of honorary citizens of Niš
List of honorary citizens of Novi Sad

References 

Zrenjanin

Zrenjanin-related lists
Honorary citizens of Zrenjanin